= Warehouse District (West Palm Beach) =

Coordinates: 26.6982°N 80.0645°W

The Warehouse District, located in the City of West Palm Beach, Florida, is a collection of industrial warehouse buildings built between 1925 and 1968 that are being redeveloped into a creative, mixed-use district. The Warehouse District consists of 85,000 square feet of restaurants, craft breweries, artistic, creative commercial and athletic uses. The neighborhood is located southwest of downtown West Palm Beach and east of Interstate 95. The project is being developed by Johnstone Capital Partners, a Palm Beach-based real estate investment firm.

== Representative tenants ==
- Grandview Public Market - A chef-driven market hall and event space.
- Palm Beach Squash - Palm Beach County's first premier boutique squash club.
- Steamhorse Brewing - West Palm Beach's first craft brewery and taproom.
- Elizabeth Avenue Station - A pop-up retail marketplace and creative-use facility.
- Studios, Etc. - An exclusive fitness studio.
- Black Coral Rum Distillery - A craft distillery with tasting room and event space.
